Niels Arp-Nielsen (28 May 1887 – 23 May 1970) was a Danish architect.

Niels Peter Edvard Arp-Nielsen was born at  Frederiksberg, Denmark. Arp-Nielsen had an independent firm from 1915. He exhibited at Charlottenborg Spring Exhibition 1920–1922.
Building designs include the Nordisk Film Company's office and factory in Copenhagen Freeport (1915) and the Trade and Agriculture Bank in Slagelse (1922).

See also
List of Danish architects

References

External links
Biography

Danish architects
1887 births
1970 deaths